Nicholas "Nicky" Orr (born 23 February 1947) is an Irish retired hurler whose league and championship career with the Kilkenny senior team spanned nine seasons from 1969 to 1976.

Born near Johnstown, County Kilkenny, Orr first played competitive hurling during his schooling at Johnstown national school. He began his club hurling career with the St. Finbarr's team, before later joining the Fenians club when it was formed in 1968. Orr won a county junior championship medal that year, which guaranteed promotion to the senior ranks the following year. An All-Ireland runner-up in 1975, he also won one Leinster medal and five county senior championship medals.

Orr made his debut on the inter-county scene at the age of twenty when he was selected for the Kilkenny intermediate team. A Leinster medal winner in this grade, he later joined the under-21 team, ending his tenure in this grade as an All-Ireland runner-up in 1968. Orr made his senior debut during the 1969-70 league. Over the course of the next nine seasons, he won three All-Ireland medals, beginning with a lone triumph in 1972 followed by back-to-back championships in 1974 and 1975. The All-Ireland-winning captain of 1974, Orr also won five Leinster medals and one National Hurling League medal. A broken kneecap in 1976 brought his inter-county career to an end.

Selected as a substitute on the Leinster inter-provincial team in 1975, Orr won his only Railway Cup medal that year.

Career statistics

Honours

Fenians
Leinster Senior Club Hurling Championship (1): 1974
Kilkenny Senior Hurling Championship (5): 1970, 1972, 1973, 1974, 1977
Kilkenny Junior Hurling Championship (1): 1969
Kilkenny Junior Football Championship (1): 1971

Kilkenny
All-Ireland Senior Hurling Championship (3): 1972, 1974 (c), 1975
Leinster Senior Hurling Championship (5): 1971, 1972, 1973, 1974 (c), 1975
National Hurling League (1): 1975-76
Leinster Intermediate Hurling Championship (1): 1967

Leinster
Railway Cup (1): 1975

References

1947 births
Living people
Fenians hurlers
Kilkenny inter-county hurlers
Leinster inter-provincial hurlers
All-Ireland Senior Hurling Championship winners